The International Journal of Central Banking (IJCB) is an economic research journal that began publication in 2005 after the decision of several Central Banks to create a professional journal for policymakers and researchers in the field of monetary policy. In July 2004, the Bank for International Settlements (BIS), the European Central Bank, and each of the Group of Ten (G-10) central banks announced their plans to support the development of a new publication focused on central bank theory and practice. Other central banks were invited to participate in this joint project, and there are now some 50 sponsoring institutions.

The primary objectives of the IJCB are to widely disseminate the best policy-relevant and applied research on central banking and to promote communication among researchers both inside and outside of central banks.

Federal Reserve Vice Chairman Roger W. Ferguson Jr. first proposed the idea of such a journal and discussed the concept with several BIS colleagues and with Federal Reserve Board Governor Ben S. Bernanke, who served as the initial managing editor. John B. Taylor, Professor of Economics at Stanford University, was appointed managing editor in September 2005. Frank Smets of the European Central Bank became managing editor in January 2008.  John Williams of the Federal Reserve Bank of San Francisco took over as managing editor in January 2011. Loretta J. Mester of the Federal Reserve Bank of Cleveland took over as managing editor in June 2016. Luc Laeven of the European Central Bank became managing editor in January 2020. Bank of England Chief Economist Charlie Bean strongly supported the project, and the journal's governing body, comprising representatives from the sponsoring institutions, was established.

Luc Laeven now serves as managing editor along with 10 co-editors: Klaus Adam, Tobias Adrian, Boragan Aruoba, Huberto Ennis, Linda Goldberg, Òscar Jordà, Sharon Kozicki, Keith Kuester, Elena Loutskina, and Steven Ongena. The managing editor and co-editors solicit and review submitted articles across a range of disciplines reflecting the missions of central banks around the world. While featuring policy-relevant articles on any aspect of the theory and practice of central banking, the publication has a special emphasis on research bearing on monetary policy and financial stability.

The IJCB is a free publication available for download from the IJCB web site.

External links

Economics journals
Quarterly journals